In Belarus, a ten-point grading scale is used since 2002. It is used in primary, secondary and higher education. 

Marks "1" and "2" are considered as "Fail" at school. In higher education "3" is also considered as "Fail".

Besides grades, a "pass" / "no pass" mark may be used for some subjects. E.g. it's an "Art" subject in Secondary School.

References 

Belarus
Education in Belarus
Grading